The 2012 Men's World Junior Team Squash Championships was held in Doha, Qatar. The event took place from 13 to 18 July 2012.

Seeds

Group stage results

Pool A

Pool B

Pool C

Pool D

Pool E

Pool F

Finals

Draw

Results

Semi-finals

Final

Post-tournament team ranking

See also
Men's World Junior Squash Championships 2012
World Junior Squash Championships

References

External links 
World Junior Squash Championships 2012 Official Website

Sports competitions in Doha
World Junior Squash Championships
World Junior
Squash tournaments in Qatar
International sports competitions hosted by Qatar